The 71st Primetime Creative Arts Emmy Awards honored the best in artistic and technical achievement in American prime time television programming from June 1, 2018, until May 31, 2019, as chosen by the Academy of Television Arts & Sciences. The awards were presented across two ceremonies on September 14 and 15, 2019, at the Microsoft Theater in Los Angeles, California. FXX broadcast an abbreviated telecast of the ceremonies on September 21, leading into the 71st Primetime Emmy Awards on September 22.

Winners and nominees

Winners are listed first, highlighted in boldface, and indicated with a double dagger (‡). Sections are based upon the categories listed in the 2018–2019 Emmy rules and procedures. Area awards and juried awards are denoted next to the category names as applicable. For simplicity, producers who received nominations for program awards have been omitted.

Governors Award
 None

Programs
{| class="wikitable"
|+ 
|-
| style="vertical-align:top;" width="50%" | 
 Live in Front of a Studio Audience: Norman Lear's 'All in the Family' and 'The Jeffersons' (ABC) The 76th Annual Golden Globe Awards (NBC)
 The 61st Grammy Awards (CBS)
 The Oscars (ABC)
 RENT (Fox)
 72nd Annual Tony Awards (CBS)
| style="vertical-align:top;" width="50%" | 
 Carpool Karaoke: When Corden Met McCartney Live From Liverpool (CBS) Hannah Gadsby: Nanette (Netflix)
 Homecoming: A Film by Beyoncé (Netflix)
 Springsteen on Broadway (Netflix)
 Wanda Sykes: Not Normal (Netflix)
|-
| style="vertical-align:top;" width="50%" | 
 When You Wish Upon a Pickle: A Sesame Street Special (HBO) A Series of Unfortunate Events (Netflix)
 Carmen Sandiego (Netflix)
 Song of Parkland (HBO)
 Star Wars Resistance (Disney Channel)
| style="vertical-align:top;" width="50%" | 
 The Simpsons: "Mad About the Toy" (Fox) Adventure Time: "Come Along with Me" (Cartoon Network)
 Big Mouth: "The Planned Parenthood Show" (Netflix)
 Bob's Burgers: "Just One of the Boyz 4 Now for Now" (Fox)
 BoJack Horseman: "Free Churro" (Netflix)
|-
| style="vertical-align:top;" width="50%" | 
 Queer Eye (Netflix) Antiques Roadshow (PBS)
 Diners, Drive-Ins and Dives (Food Network)
 Shark Tank (ABC)
 Tidying Up with Marie Kondo (Netflix)
 Who Do You Think You Are? (TLC)
| style="vertical-align:top;" width="50%" | 
 United Shades of America with W. Kamau Bell (CNN) Born This Way (A&E)
 Deadliest Catch (Discovery Channel)
 Life Below Zero (Nat Geo)
 RuPaul's Drag Race: Untucked (VH1)
 Somebody Feed Phil (Netflix)
|-
| style="vertical-align:top;" width="50%" | 
 Our Planet (Netflix) 30 for 30 (ESPN)
 American Masters (PBS)
 Chef's Table (Netflix)
 Hostile Planet (Nat Geo)
| style="vertical-align:top;" width="50%" | 
 Leaving Neverland (HBO) FYRE: The Greatest Party That Never Happened (Netflix)
 The Inventor: Out for Blood in Silicon Valley (HBO)
 Jane Fonda in Five Acts (HBO)
 Love, Gilda (CNN)
 Minding the Gap (Hulu)
|-
| style="vertical-align:top;" width="50%" | 
 Anthony Bourdain: Parts Unknown (CNN) Comedians in Cars Getting Coffee (Netflix)
 Leah Remini: Scientology and the Aftermath (A&E)
 My Next Guest Needs No Introduction with David Letterman (Netflix)
 Surviving R. Kelly (Lifetime)
| style="vertical-align:top;" width="50%" | 
 RBG (CNN) The Sentence (HBO) Divide and Conquer: The Story of Roger Ailes (A&E)
 Hale County This Morning, This Evening (PBS)
 Three Identical Strangers (CNN)
|-
| style="vertical-align:top;" width="50%" | 
 State of the Union (Sundance TV) An Emmy for Megan (AnEmmyforMegan.com)
 Hack Into Broad City (Comedy Central)
 It's Bruno! (Netflix)
 Special (Netflix)
| style="vertical-align:top;" width="50%" | 
 Carpool Karaoke: The Series (Apple Music) Billy on the Street (Funny or Die)
 Gay Of Thrones (Funny or Die)
 Honest Trailers (YouTube)
 The Randy Rainbow Show (YouTube)
|-
| style="vertical-align:top;" width="50%" | 
 Creating Saturday Night Live (NBC) Fosse/Verdon (Inside Look) (FX)
 Pose: Identity, Family, Community (Inside Look) (FX)
 RuPaul's Drag Race's: Out Of The Closet (VH1)
 RuPaul's Drag Race's: Portrait Of A Queen (VH1)
| style="vertical-align:top;" width="50%" | 
 Love, Death & Robots: "The Witness" (Netflix) Robot Chicken: "Why Is It Wet?" (Adult Swim)
 SpongeBob SquarePants: "Plankton Paranoia" (Nickelodeon)
 Steven Universe: "Reunited" (Cartoon Network)
 Teen Titans Go!: "Nostalgia Is Not a Substitute for an Actual Story" (Cartoon Network)
|-
| style="vertical-align:top;" width="50%" | 
 NASA InSight's Mars Landing (NASA TV) First Man VR (Windows Mixed Reality)
 HQ Trivia x Warner Bros.: A Live and Interactive Animation First (HQ Trivia)
 Traveling While Black (Oculus)
 You vs. Wild (Netflix)
| style="vertical-align:top;" width="50%" | 
 NASA And SpaceX: The Interactive Demo-1 Launch (YouTube) Conan (TBS)
 Last Week Tonight with John Oliver (HBO)
 The Daily Show with Trevor Noah (Comedy Central)
 The Late Late Show with James Corden (CBS)
 The Late Show with Stephen Colbert (CBS)
|-
| style="vertical-align:top;" width="50%" | 
 Bandersnatch (Black Mirror) (Netflix) Game of Thrones – Fight for the Living: Beyond the Wall Virtual Reality Experience (HBO)
 The Good Place – Interactive Fan Experience (NBC)
| style="vertical-align:top;" width="50%" | 
 Free Solo 360 (Nat Geo) CONAN Without Borders Japan & Australia (TBS)
 The Late Late Show Carpool Karaoke Primetime Special 2019 (CBS)
 The Oscars – Digital Experience (ABC)
|-
| style="vertical-align:top;" width="50%" colspan="2" | 
 Artificial (Twitch) Wolves in the Walls: It’s All Over (Oculus Store)|}

Performing

Animation
{| class="wikitable"
|+ 
|-
| style="vertical-align:top;" | 
 Age of Sail – Céline Desrumaux (YouTube) Age of Sail – Bruno Mangyoku (YouTube) Age of Sail – Jasmin Lai (YouTube) Carmen Sandiego: "The Chasing Paper Caper" – Elaine Lee (Netflix) Love, Death & Robots: "Good Hunting" – Jun-ho Kim (Netflix) Love, Death & Robots: "Sucker of Souls" – Owen Sullivan (Netflix) Love, Death & Robots: "The Witness" – Alberto Mielgo (Netflix) Love, Death & Robots: "The Witness" – David Pate (Netflix)|}

Art Direction
{| class="wikitable"
|+ 
|-
| style="vertical-align:top;" width="50%" | 
 The Handmaid's Tale: "Holly" (Hulu) Escape at Dannemora (Showtime)
 Killing Eve: "The Hungry Caterpillar" (BBC America)
 Ozark: "Outer Darkness, The Gold Coast" (Netflix)
 The Umbrella Academy: "We Only See Each Other at Weddings and Funerals" (Netflix)
| style="vertical-align:top;" width="50%" | 
 Chernobyl (HBO) A Series of Unfortunate Events: "Penultimate Peril: Part 1" (Netflix)
 Fosse/Verdon (FX)
 Game of Thrones: "The Bells" (HBO)
 The Man in the High Castle: "Now More Than Ever, We Care About You" (Prime Video)
 The Marvelous Mrs. Maisel: "Simone" / "We're Going to the Catskills!" (Prime Video)
|-
| style="vertical-align:top;" width="50%" | 
 Russian Doll: "Nothing in the World Is Easy" (Netflix) Barry: "ronny/lily" (HBO)
 Veep: "Veep" (HBO)
 Will & Grace: "Jack's Big Gay Wedding" (NBC)
| style="vertical-align:top;" width="50%" | 
 Saturday Night Live: "Host: John Mulaney" / "Host: Emma Stone" (NBC) At Home with Amy Sedaris: "Teenagers" (truTV)
 Last Week Tonight with John Oliver: "Authoritarianism" (HBO)
 Queer Eye: "Jones Bar-B-Q" (Netflix)
 The Voice: "Live Cross Battles Part 1" (NBC)
|-
| style="vertical-align:top;" width="50%" colspan="2" | 
 RENT (Fox) The 61st Grammy Awards (CBS)
 Homecoming: A Film by Beyoncé (Netflix)
 Live in Front of a Studio Audience: Norman Lear's All in the Family and The Jeffersons (ABC)
 The Oscars (ABC)
|}

Casting
{| class="wikitable"
|+ 
|-
| style="vertical-align:top;" width="50%" | 
 Fleabag (Prime Video) Barry (HBO)
 The Marvelous Mrs. Maisel (Prime Video)
 Russian Doll (Netflix)
 Veep (HBO)
| style="vertical-align:top;" width="50%" | 
 Game of Thrones (HBO) Killing Eve (BBC America)
 Ozark (Netflix)
 Pose (FX)
 Succession (HBO)
|-
| style="vertical-align:top;" width="50%" | 
 When They See Us (Netflix) Chernobyl (HBO)
 Escape at Dannemora (Showtime)
 Fosse/Verdon (FX)
 Sharp Objects (HBO)
| style="vertical-align:top;" width="50%" | 
 Queer Eye (Netflix) Born This Way (A&E)
 RuPaul's Drag Race (VH1)
 Shark Tank (ABC)
 The Voice (NBC)
|}

Choreography
{| class="wikitable"
|+ 
|-
| style="vertical-align:top;" width="50%" | 
 World of Dance – Tessandra Chavez (NBC) So You Think You Can Dance – Luther Brown (Fox)
 So You Think You Can Dance – Travis Wall (Fox)
 World of Dance – Karen Forcano and Ricardo Vega (NBC)
 World of Dance – Suresh Mukund (NBC)
 World of Dance – Melvin "Timtim" Rogador (NBC)
| style="vertical-align:top;" width="50%" | 
 Crazy Ex-Girlfriend: "Don't Be a Lawyer" / "Antidepressants Are So Not a Big Deal" – Kathryn Burns (The CW)|}

Cinematography

Commercial

Costumes

Directing
{| class="wikitable"
|+ 
|-
| style="vertical-align:top;" width="50%" | 
 Free Solo – Elizabeth Chai Vasarhelyi and Jimmy Chin (Nat Geo) FYRE: The Greatest Party That Never Happened – Chris Smith (Netflix)
 Leaving Neverland – Dan Reed (HBO)
 RBG – Julie Cohen and Betsy West (CNN)
 Three Identical Strangers – Tim Wardle (CNN)
| style="vertical-align:top;" width="50%" | 
 Springsteen on Broadway – Thom Zimny (Netflix) Carpool Karaoke: When Corden Met McCartney Live From Liverpool – Ben Winston (CBS)
 Homecoming: A Film by Beyoncé – Beyoncé Knowles-Carter and Ed Burke (Netflix)
 Live in Front of a Studio Audience: Norman Lear's All in the Family and The Jeffersons – James Burrows and Andy Fisher (ABC)
 The Oscars – Glenn Weiss (ABC)
|-
| style="vertical-align:top;" width="50%" colspan="2" | 
 Queer Eye: "Black Girl Magic" – Hisham Abed (Netflix)'''
 The Amazing Race: "Who Wants A Rolex?" – Bertram van Munster (CBS)
 American Ninja Warrior: "Minneapolis City Qualifiers" – Patrick McManus (NBC)
 RuPaul's Drag Race: "Whatcha Unpackin?" – Nick Murray (VH1)
 Shark Tank: "Episode 1002" – Ken Fuchs (ABC)
|}

Hairstyling
{| class="wikitable"
|+ 
|-
| style="vertical-align:top;" width="50%" | 
 The Marvelous Mrs. Maisel: "We're Going to the Catskills!" (Prime Video) American Horror Story: Apocalypse: "Forbidden Fruit" (FX)
 Game of Thrones: "The Long Night" (HBO)
 GLOW: "The Good Twin" (Netflix)
 Pose: "Pilot" (FX)
| style="vertical-align:top;" width="50%" | 
 RuPaul's Drag Race: "Trump: The Rusical" (VH1) Dancing with the Stars: "Halloween Night" (ABC)
 Saturday Night Live: "Host: Adam Sandler" (NBC)
 The Voice: "Live Top 13 Performances" (NBC)
 World of Dance: "Episode 306" (NBC)
|-
| style="vertical-align:top;" width="50%" colspan="2" | 
 Fosse/Verdon (FX) Chernobyl (HBO)
 Deadwood: The Movie (HBO)
 Sharp Objects: "Closer" (HBO)
 True Detective (HBO)
|}

Lighting Design / Direction
{| class="wikitable"
|+ 
|-
| style="vertical-align:top;" width="50%" | 
 Saturday Night Live: "Host: John Mulaney" (NBC) America's Got Talent: "Semi Final #1 Performance Show" (NBC)
 Dancing with the Stars: "Semi-Finals" (ABC)
 So You Think You Can Dance: "Finale" (Fox)
 The Voice: "Live Finale, Part 1" (NBC)
| style="vertical-align:top;" width="50%" | 
 RENT (Fox) The 61st Grammy Awards (CBS)
 Kennedy Center Honors (CBS)
 The Oscars (ABC)
 72nd Annual Tony Awards (CBS)
|}

Main Title and Motion Design
{| class="wikitable"
|+ 
|-
| style="vertical-align:top;" width="50%" | 
 Game of Thrones (HBO) Conversations with a Killer: The Ted Bundy Tapes (Netflix)
 Star Trek: Discovery (CBS All Access)
 True Detective (HBO)
 Warrior (Cinemax)
| style="vertical-align:top;" width="50%" | 
 Patriot Act with Hasan Minhaj – Michelle Higa Fox, Jorge L. Peschiera, Yussef Cole, Brandon Sugiyama, and Paris London Glickman (Netflix)|}

Make-up
{| class="wikitable"
|+ 
|-
| style="vertical-align:top;" width="50%" | 
 Game of Thrones: "The Long Night" (HBO) American Horror Story: Apocalypse: "Forbidden Fruit" (FX)
 GLOW: "The Good Twin" (Netflix)
 The Marvelous Mrs. Maisel: "We're Going to the Catskills!" (Prime Video)
 Pose: "Pilot" (FX)
| style="vertical-align:top;" width="50%" | 
 Saturday Night Live: "Host: Adam Sandler" (NBC) Dancing with the Stars: "Halloween Night" (ABC)
 RENT (Fox)
 RuPaul's Drag Race: "Trump: The Rusical" (VH1)
 So You Think You Can Dance: "Finale" (Fox)
 The Voice: "Live Top 13 Performances" (NBC)
|-
| style="vertical-align:top;" width="50%" | 
 Fosse/Verdon (FX) Chernobyl (HBO)
 Deadwood: The Movie (HBO)
 Sharp Objects (HBO)
 True Detective (HBO)
| style="vertical-align:top;" width="50%" | 
 Star Trek: Discovery: "If Memory Serves" (CBS All Access) American Horror Story: Apocalypse: "Apocalypse Then" (FX)
 Chernobyl (HBO)
 Fosse/Verdon (FX)
 Game of Thrones: "The Long Night" (HBO)
|}

Music
{| class="wikitable"
|+ 
|-
| style="vertical-align:top;" width="50%" | 
 Game of Thrones: "The Long Night" – Ramin Djawadi (HBO) Barry: "What?!" – David Wingo (HBO)
 The Handmaid's Tale: "The Word" – Adam Taylor (Hulu)
 House of Cards: "Chapter 73" – Jeff Beal (Netflix)
 This Is Us: "Songbird Road: Part One" – Siddhartha Khosla (NBC)
| style="vertical-align:top;" width="50%" | 
 Chernobyl: "Please Remain Calm" – Hildur Guðnadóttir (HBO) Escape at Dannemora: "Episode 5" – Edward Shearmur (Showtime)
 Good Omens: "In the Beginning" – David Arnold (Prime Video)
 True Detective: "The Final Country" – Keefus Ciancia and T Bone Burnett (HBO)
 When They See Us: "Part Two" – Kris Bowers (Netflix)
|-
| style="vertical-align:top;" width="50%" | 
 Free Solo – Brandon Roberts and Marco Beltrami (Nat Geo) Game of Thrones: The Last Watch – Hannah Peel (HBO)
 Hostile Planet: "Oceans" – Benjamin Wallfisch (Nat Geo)
 Love, Gilda – Miriam Cutler (CNN)
 Our Planet: "One Planet" – Steven Price (Netflix)
 RBG – Miriam Cutler (CNN)
| style="vertical-align:top;" width="50%" | 
 Fosse/Verdon: "Life Is a Cabaret" – Alex Lacamoire (FX) Aretha! A Grammy Celebration for the Queen of Soul – Rickey Minor (CBS)
 Homecoming: A Film by Beyoncé – Beyoncé Knowles-Carter and Derek Dixie (Netflix)
 The Oscars – Rickey Minor (ABC)
 Q85: A Musical Celebration for Quincy Jones: "Part 1" – Greg Phillinganes (BET)
 Saturday Night Live: "Host: Adam Sandler" – Lenny Pickett, Leon Pendarvis, and Eli Brueggemann (NBC)
|-
| style="vertical-align:top;" width="50%" | 
 Succession – Nicholas Britell (HBO) Castle Rock – Thomas Newman (Hulu)
 Crazy Ex-Girlfriend – Rachel Bloom, Jack Dolgen, and Adam Schlesinger (The CW)
 Good Omens – David Arnold (Prime Video)
 Our Planet – Steven Price (Netflix) 
| style="vertical-align:top;" width="50%" | 
 Crazy Ex-Girlfriend: "I Have to Get Out" – "Antidepressants Are So Not a Big Deal" (The CW) 72nd Tony Awards – "This One's for You" (CBS)
 Documentary Now!: "Original Cast Album: Co-op" – "Holiday Party (I Did a Little Cocaine Tonight") (IFC)
 Flight of the Conchords: Live In London – "Father & Son" (HBO)
 Saturday Night Live: "Host: James McAvoy" – "The Upper East Side" (NBC)
 Song of Parkland – "Beautiful Things Can Grow" (HBO)
|-
| style="vertical-align:top;" width="50%" colspan="2" | 
 The Marvelous Mrs. Maisel: "We're Going to the Catskills!" – Robin Urdang, Amy Sherman-Palladino and Daniel Palladino (Prime Video) Better Call Saul: "Something Stupid" – Thomas Golubić (AMC)
 Fosse/Verdon: "Life Is a Cabaret" – Steven Gizicki (FX)
 Quincy – Jasper Leak (Netflix)
 Russian Doll: "Nothing in This World Is Easy" – Brienne Rose (Netflix)
|}

Picture Editing
{| class="wikitable"
|+ 
|-
| style="vertical-align:top;" width="50%" | 
 Game of Thrones: "The Long Night" – Tim Porter (HBO) Game of Thrones: "The Iron Throne" – Katie Weiland (HBO)
 Game of Thrones: "Winterfell" – Crispin Green (HBO)
 The Handmaid's Tale: "The Word" – Wendy Hallam Martin (Hulu)
 Killing Eve: "Desperate Times" – Dan Crinnion (BBC America)
 Ozark: "One Way Out" – Cindy Mollo and Heather Goodwin Floyd (Netflix)
| style="vertical-align:top;" width="50%" | 
 Fleabag: "Episode 1" – Gary Dollner (Prime Video) Barry: "berkman > block" – Kyle Reiter (HBO)
 Barry: "ronny/lily" – Jeff Buchanan (HBO)
 The Marvelous Mrs. Maisel: "Simone" – Kate Sanford (Prime Video)
 The Marvelous Mrs. Maisel: "We're Going to the Catskills!" – Tim Streeto (Prime Video)
 Russian Doll: "Ariadne" – Laura Weinberg (Netflix)
|-
| style="vertical-align:top;" width="50%" | 
 Chernobyl: "Please Remain Calm" – Simon Smith (HBO) Chernobyl: "Open Wide, O Earth" – Jinx Godfrey (HBO)
 Deadwood: The Movie – Martin Nicholson and Erick Fefferman (HBO)
 Fosse/Verdon: "Life Is a Cabaret" – Tim Streeto (FX)
 Sharp Objects: "Fix" – Véronique Barbe, Justin Lachance, Maxime Lahaie, Émile Vallée, and Jai M. Vee (HBO)
 True Detective: "If You Have Ghosts" – Leo Trombetta (HBO)
| style="vertical-align:top;" width="50%" | 
 One Day at a Time: "The Funeral" – Pat Barnett (Netflix) The Big Bang Theory: "The Stockholm Syndrome" – Peter Chakos (CBS)
 The Conners: "Keep On Truckin' – Brian Schnuckel (ABC)
 Mom: "Big Floor Pillows and a Ball of Fire" – Joe Bella (CBS)
 Will & Grace: "Family, Trip" – Peter Beyt (NBC)
|-
| style="vertical-align:top;" width="50%" | 
 Last Week Tonight with John Oliver: "The Wax & the Furious" – Ryan Barger (HBO) Carpool Karaoke: When Corden Met McCartney Live From Liverpool – Tom Jarvis (CBS)
 Drunk History: "Are You Afraid of the Drunk?" – John Cason (Comedy Central)
 Last Week Tonight with John Oliver: "The Journey Of ChiiJohn" – Anthony Miale (HBO)
 Who Is America?: "Episode 102" – Drew Kordik, Eric Notarnicola, Roger Nygard, Matt Davis and Jeremy Cohen (Showtime)
| style="vertical-align:top;" width="50%" | 
 Free Solo – Bob Eisenhardt (Nat Geo) Anthony Bourdain: Parts Unknown: "Lower East Side" – Tom Patterson (CNN)
 Leaving Neverland – Jules Cornell (HBO)
 RBG – Carla Gutierrez (CNN)
 Three Identical Strangers – Michael Harte (CNN)
|-
| style="vertical-align:top;" width="50%" | 
 Queer Eye – Joseph Deshano, Matthew Miller, Ryan Taylor, Carlos Gamarra, Iain Tibbles, and Tony Zajkowski (Netflix) The Amazing Race: "Who Wants a Rolex?" – Kellen Cruden, Christina Fontana, Jay Gammill, Katherine Griffin, Josh Lowry, Steve Mellon, and Jason Pedroza (CBS)
 RuPaul's Drag Race – Jamie Martin, Michael Lynn Deis, Julie Tseselsky Kirschner, John Lim, Ryan Mallick, Michael Roha, and Corey Ziemniak (VH1)
 RuPaul's Drag Race All Stars: "Jersey Justice" – Molly Shock, Eileen Finkelstein, Michael Lynn Deis, Myron Santos, Steve Brown, Ray Van Ness, and Michael Hellwig (VH1)
 Survivor: "Appearances Are Deceiving" – Fred Hawthorne, Andrew Bolhuis, Joubin Mortazavi, Plowden Schumacher, David Armstrong, Evan Mediuch, and Jacob Teixeira (CBS)
| style="vertical-align:top;" width="50%" | 
 United Shades of America with W. Kamau Bell: "Hmong Americans and the Secret War" – Alessandro Soares (CNN) Born This Way – Jarrod Burt, Jacob Lane, Annie Ray, Steve Miloszewski, Malinda Guerra, David Henry, Stephanie Lyra, Dana Martell, David McIntosh, Svein Mikkelsen, Patrick Post, Ryan Rambach, Peggy Tachdjian, Lisa Trulli, Kjer Westbye, and Dan Zimmerman (A&E)
 Deadliest Catch: "Battle of Kings" – Rob Butler, Isaiah Camp, Nathen Araiza, Ben Bulatao and Greg Cornejo (Discovery Channel)
 Life Below Zero: "Cost of Winter" – Tony Diaz, Matt Mercer, Jennifer Nelson, Eric Michael Schrader and Michael Swingler (Nat Geo)
 RuPaul's Drag Race: Untucked – Kendra Pasker, Shayna Casey, and Stavros Stavropoulos (VH1)
|}

Sound Editing
{| class="wikitable"
|+ 
|-
| style="vertical-align:top;" width="50%" | 
 Game of Thrones: "The Long Night" (HBO) Better Call Saul: "Talk" (AMC)
 Gotham: "Legend of the Dark Knight: I Am Bane" (Fox)
 Star Trek: Discovery: "Such Sweet Sorrow, Part 2" (CBS)
 Tom Clancy's Jack Ryan: "Pilot" (Prime Video)
| style="vertical-align:top;" width="50%" | 
 Barry: "ronny/lily" (HBO) Ballers: "This Is Not Our World" (HBO)
 Love, Death & Robots: "The Secret War" (Netflix)
 Russian Doll: "The Way Out" (Netflix)
 What We Do in the Shadows: "Werewolf Feud" (FX)
|-
| style="vertical-align:top;" width="50%" | 
 Chernobyl: "1:23:45" (HBO) Catch-22: "Episode 1" (Hulu)
 Deadwood: The Movie (HBO)
 True Detective: "The Great War and Modern Memory" (HBO)
 When They See Us: "Part Four" (Netflix)
| style="vertical-align:top;" width="50%" | 
 Free Solo (Nat Geo) Anthony Bourdain: Parts Unknown: "Far West Texas" (CNN)
 FYRE: The Greatest Party That Never Happened (Netflix)
 Leaving Neverland (HBO)
 Our Planet: "Frozen Worlds" (Netflix)
|}

Sound Mixing
{| class="wikitable"
|+ 
|-
| style="vertical-align:top;" width="50%" | 
 Game of Thrones: "The Long Night" (HBO) Better Call Saul: "Talk" (AMC)
 The Handmaid's Tale: "Holly" (Hulu)
 The Marvelous Mrs. Maisel: "Vote for Kennedy, Vote for Kennedy" (Prime Video)
 Ozark: "The Badger" (Netflix)
| style="vertical-align:top;" width="50%" | 
 Chernobyl: "1:23:45" (HBO) Deadwood: The Movie (HBO)
 Fosse/Verdon: "All I Care About Is Love" (FX)
 True Detective: "The Great War and Modern Memory" (HBO)
 When They See Us: "Part Four" (Netflix)
|-
| style="vertical-align:top;" width="50%" | 
 Barry: "ronny/lily" (HBO) The Kominsky Method: "Chapter 1: An Actor Avoids" (Netflix)
 Modern Family: "A Year of Birthdays" (ABC)
 Russian Doll: "The Way Out" (Netflix)
 Veep: "Veep" (HBO)
| style="vertical-align:top;" width="50%" | 
 Aretha! A Grammy Celebration for the Queen of Soul (CBS) Carpool Karaoke: When Corden Met McCartney Live from Liverpool (CBS)
 The 61st Grammy Awards (CBS)
 Last Week Tonight with John Oliver: "Authoritarianism" (HBO)
 The Oscars (ABC)
|-
| style="vertical-align:top;" width="50%" colspan="2" | 
 Free Solo (Nat Geo) Anthony Bourdain: Parts Unknown: "Kenya" (CNN)
 FYRE: The Greatest Party That Never Happened (Netflix)
 Leaving Neverland (HBO)
 Our Planet: "Frozen Worlds" (Netflix)
|}

Special Visual Effects
{| class="wikitable"
|+ 
|-
| style="vertical-align:top;" width="50%" | 
 Game of Thrones: "The Bells" – Joe Bauer, Steve Kullback, Adam Chazen, Sam Conway, Mohsen Mousavi, Martin Hill, Ted Rae, Patrick Tiberius Gehlen, and Thomas Schelesny (HBO) The Man in the High Castle: "Jahr Null" – Lawson Deming, Cory Jamieson, Casi Blume, Nick Chamberlain, Bill Parker, Saber Jlassi, Chris Parks, Brian Hobert, and Danielle Malambri (Prime Video)
 The Orville: "Identity Part II" – Luke McDonald, Tommy Tran, Kevin Lingenfelser, Nhat Phong Tran, Brooke Noska, Melissa Delong, Brandon Fayette, Matt Von Brock, and Joseph Vincent Pike (Fox)
 Star Trek: Discovery: "Such Sweet Sorrow, Part 2" – Jason Michael Zimmerman, Ante Dekovic, Ivan Kondrup Jensen, Mahmoud Rahnama, Alexander Wood, Aleksandra Kochoska, Charles Collyer, Fausto Tejeda, and Darcy Callaghan (CBS All Access)
 The Umbrella Academy: "The White Violin" – Everett Burrell, R. Christopher White, Jeff Campbell, Sebastien Bergeron, Sean Schur, Steve Dellerson, Libby Hazell, Carrie Richardson, and Misato Shinohara (Netflix)
| style="vertical-align:top;" width="50%" | 
 Chernobyl: "1:23:45" – Lindsay McFarlane, Max Dennison, Claudius Christian Rauch, Clare Cheetham, Laura Bethencourt Montes, Steven Godfrey, Luke Letkey, Christian Waite, and William Foulser (HBO)' Catch-22: "Episode 4" – Matt Kasmir, Brian Connor, Dan Charbit, Matthew Wheelon Hunt, Alun Cummings, Gavin Harrison, Giovanni Casadei, Remi Martin, and Peter Farkas (Hulu)
 Deadwood: The Movie – Eric Hayden, David Altenau, Alex Torres, Joseph Vincent Pike, Ian Northrop, Christopher Flynn, David Blumenfeld, Matthew Rappaport, and David Rand (HBO)
 Escape at Dannemora: "Episode 6" – Steven Kirshoff, Joe Heffernan, John Bair, Djuna Wahlrab, Matthew Griffin, Shannen Walsh, Joseph Brigati, Vance Miller, and Min Hwa Jung (Showtime)
 Tom Clancy's Jack Ryan: "Pilot" – Erik Henry, Matt Robken, Jamie Klein, Pau Costa Moeller, Bobo Skipper, Deak Ferrand, Crawford Reilly, Francois Lambert, and Joseph Kasparian (Prime Video)
|}

Stunt Coordination
{| class="wikitable"
|+ 
|-
| style="vertical-align:top;" width="50%" | 
 'GLOW – Shauna Duggins (Netflix) Barry – Wade Allen (HBO)
 Cobra Kai – Hiro Koda and Jahnel Curfman (YouTube Premium)
 Russian Doll – Christopher Place (Netflix)
 The Tick – Chris Cenatiempo (Prime Video)
| style="vertical-align:top;" width="50%" | 
 Game of Thrones – Rowley Irlam (HBO)' The Blacklist – Cort L. Hessler III (NBC)
 Blindspot – Christopher Place (NBC)
 S.W.A.T. – Charlie Brewer (CBS)
 SEAL Team – Peewee Piemonte and Julie Michaels (CBS)
|}

Technical Direction
{| class="wikitable"
|+ 
|-
| style="vertical-align:top;" width="50%" | 
 'Last Week Tonight with John Oliver: "Psychics" – Dave Saretsky, August Yuson, John Harrison, Dante Pagano, Jake Hoover, and Phil Salanto (HBO) The Big Bang Theory: "The Stockholm Syndrome" – John D. O'Brien, John Pierre Dechene, Richard G. Price, James L. Hitchcock, Brian Wayne Armstrong, and John E. Goforth (CBS)
 Conan: "Episode 1232" – Iqbal S. Hans, John Palacio Jr., Seth Saint Vincent, Nicholas Kober, Ken Dahlquist, James Palczewski, and Ted Ashton (TBS)
 The Late Late Show with James Corden: "Post AFC Championship Show with Chris Pratt and Russell Wilson" – Oleg Sekulovski, Taylor Campanian, Joel Binger, Scott Daniels, Peter Hutchinson, Michael Jarocki, Adam Margolis, Mark McIntire, Jimmy Verlande, and John Perry (CBS)
 Saturday Night Live: "Host: Adam Sandler" – Steven Cimino, Frank Grisanti, Susan Noll, John Pinto, Paul Cangialosi, Len Wechsler, Dave Driscoll, and Eric A. Eisenstein (NBC)
 The Voice: "Live Finale, Part 2" – Allan Wells, Terrance Ho, Diane Biederbeck, Danny Bonilla, Manny Bonilla, Robert Burnette, Suzanne Ebner, Guido Frenzel, Nick Gomez, Alex Hernandez, Marc Hunter, Scott Hylton, Katherine Iacofano, Scott Kaye, Steve Martyniuk, Jofre Rosero, and Steve Simmons (NBC)
| style="vertical-align:top;" width="50%" | 
 The Late Late Show Carpool Karaoke Primetime Special 2019 – Oleg Sekulovski, Taylor Campanian, Joel Binger, Jim Velarde, Edward Nelson, Mark McIntire, Adam Margolis, Jorge Ferris, Mike Jarocki, Peter Hutchison, Charlie Wupperman, Joshua Gitersonke, Ian McGlocklin, Doug Longwill, Joshua Greenrock, Trace Dantzig, William O'Donnell, Max Kerby, and Scott Acosta (CBS)' The Kennedy Center Honors – Eric Becker, J.M. Hurley, Susan Noll, Rob Balton, David Eastwood, Patrick Gleason, Danny Bonilla, Charlie Huntley, Helene Haviland, Steven R. Martyniuk, Jay Kulick, Freddy Frederick, Jimmy O'Donnell, Lyn Noland, Mark Whitman, and Easter Xua (CBS)
 The Oscars – Kenneth Shapiro, Eric Becker, John Pritchett, Terrence Ho, Guy Jones, Keith Winikoff, Ralph Bolton, David Carline, Bob Del Russo, David Eastwood, Suzanne Ebner, Freddy Frederick, Shaun Harkins, Garrett Hurt, Jay Kulick, Tore Livia, Allen Merriweather, Lyn Noland, George Prince, Dan Webb, Rob Palmer, David Plakos, Easter Xua, Rob Balton, and Danny Bonilla (ABC)
 RENT – Eric Becker, Charles Ciup, Emelie Scaminaci, Chris Hill, Bert Atkinson, Nat Havholm, Ron Lehman, David Levisohn, Tore Livia, Adam Margolis, Rob Palmer, Brian Reason, Dylan Sanford, Damien Tuffereau, and Andrew Waruszewski (Fox)
 72nd Annual Tony Awards – Eric Becker, Mike Anderson, J.M. Hurley, Ka-Lai Wong, Rob Balton, Bob Del Russo, Charlie Huntley, Jay Kulick, John Kosmaczewski, Tore Livia, James Scurti, Lyn Noland, Jimmy O'Donnell, Jim Tufaro, Mark Whitman, and David Smith (CBS)
|}

Writing
{| class="wikitable"
|+ 
|-
| style="vertical-align:top;" width="50%" | 
 'Hannah Gadsby: Nanette – Hannah Gadsby (Netflix) Adam Sandler: 100% Fresh – Adam Sandler (Netflix)
 Amy Schumer: Growing – Amy Schumer (Netflix)
 Carpool Karaoke: When Corden Met McCartney Live from Liverpool – Matt Roberts, James Corden, Rob Crabbe, Lawrence Dai, Dicky Eagan, Nate Fernald, Lauren Greenberg, John Kennedy, Ian Karmel, James Longman, Jared Moskowitz, Sean O'Connor, Tim Siedell, Benjamin Stout, Louis Waymouth, and Ben Winston (CBS)
 Homecoming: A Film by Beyoncé – Beyoncé Knowles-Carter (Netflix)
 Wanda Sykes: Not Normal – Wanda Sykes (Netflix)
| style="vertical-align:top;" width="50%" | 
 Anthony Bourdain: Parts Unknown: "Kenya" – Anthony Bourdain (CNN)' The Case Against Adnan Syed: "Forbidden Love" – Amy J. Berg (HBO)
 Fyre Fraud – Julia Willoughby Nason and Jenner Furst (Hulu)
 Hostile Planet: "Grasslands" – Bruce Kennedy (Nat Geo)
 Our Planet: "Jungles" – Huw Cordey, Keith Scholey, Alastair Fothergill, and David Attenborough (Netflix)
 Wu-Tang Clan: Of Mics and Men: "Episode 1" – Paul Greenhouse, Sacha Jenkins, and Peter J. Scalettar (Showtime)
|}

Changes
The Television Academy announced a few minor changes in the rules of some categories and the addition of a new category.

 The addition of a new category, Outstanding Music Composition for a Documentary Series or Special (Original Dramatic Underscore) recognizing the unique creative process and evaluation criteria for documentary scoring, versus scoring for scripted series or specials.
 The category Outstanding Choreography has been restructured and divided in two, Outstanding Choreography for Variety and Reality Programming (for Variety Series, Variety Special, Structured Reality, Unstructured Reality and Competition Program) and Outstanding Choreography for Scripted Programming (for Comedy Series, Drama Series, Limited Series and Television Movie), both being juried awards.

Wins by network

Programs with multiple awards

Most nominationsSources'':

Notes

References

External links
 Academy of Television Arts and Sciences website

071 Creative Arts
2019 in American television
2019 in Los Angeles
2019 awards in the United States
2019 television awards
September 2019 events in the United States